Leopoldo Saínz de la Maza Gutiérrez-Solana y Gómez de la Puente, 1st Count of la Maza (22 December 1879 – 3 February 1954) was a Spanish polo player. He competed at the 1920 Summer Olympics and the 1924 Summer Olympics, winning a silver medal in 1920.

See also
Count of la Maza

References

External links
 

1879 births
1954 deaths
Spanish polo players
Polo players at the 1920 Summer Olympics
Polo players at the 1924 Summer Olympics
Olympic medalists in polo
Olympic polo players of Spain
Olympic silver medalists for Spain
Medalists at the 1920 Summer Olympics
People from Utrera
Sportspeople from the Province of Seville